{{Speciesbox
| image = Espartillo.jpg
| status = G4
| status_system = TNC
| genus = Sporobolus
| species = spartinae
| authority = (Trin.) P.M.Peterson & Saarela
| synonyms =  
 Spartina argentinensis Parodi
 Spartina spartinae <small>(Trin.) Merr. ex Hitchc.</small>
 Vilfa spartinae Trin.
 Spartina densiflora var. junciformis (Engelm. & A.Gray) St.-Yves
 Spartina densiflora var. obtusa Hack.
 Spartina gouinii E.Fourn.
 Spartina junciformis Engelm. & A.Gray
 Spartina multiflora Beal
 Spartina pittieri Hack.

|}}Sporobolus spartinae is a species of grass known by the common names gulf cordgrass and sacahuista. It is native to the Americas, where it occurs from the Gulf Coast of the United States south to Argentina.

This species forms dense clumps of sharp-tipped leaves. The stems may grow up to 2 meters tall. The inflorescence is a cylindrical panicle up to 70 centimeters long. It has many branches each a few centimetres long which grow pressed to the stem. They contain spikelets each up to a centimeter in length.

This grass grows in moist to wet habitat and it can live in saline environments. Habitat types include marshes and wet prairies. It can sometimes be found inland alongside Pinus palustris''.

References

spartinae